Bruno Konczylo (born 26 August 1968 in Châteaudun) is a retired French middle-distance runner who competed primarily in the 800 metres. He represented his country at the 1996 Summer Olympics, as well as the 1995 World Championships, reaching the semifinals on both occasions.

His personal bests in the event are 1:45.02 outdoors (Zürich 1995) and 1:47.66 indoors (Paris 1994).

Competition record

References

1968 births
Living people
French male middle-distance runners
Athletes (track and field) at the 1996 Summer Olympics
Olympic athletes of France
French people of Polish descent